Count John II of Waldeck-Landau (7 November 1623 – 10 October 1668), official titles: Graf zu Waldeck und Pyrmont, Herr zu Tonna, was since 1638 Count of . He served in the Swedish Army.

Biography

John was born on 7 November 1623 in Waldeck as the fourteenth child of Count Christian of Waldeck-Wildungen and his wife Countess Elisabeth of Nassau-Siegen.

He had his Residenz in Landau since then. The entire County of Waldeck, was heavily in debt. The lordship was sold to Duke Frederick I of Saxe-Gotha-Altenburg in 1677.

John served as major general in the Swedish Army. As he was childless, the county of Waldeck-Landau was inherited by his nephew Christian Louis of Waldeck-Wildungen.

Marriages
John married firstly on 17 December 1644 to Alexandrine Maria Gräfin von Vehlen und Meggen (? – Thorn, 27 February 1662). She was the widow of Count Emich of Daun-Falkenstein.

Ancestors

References

Sources

External links
 Descendants of Wolrad I Gf von Waldeck in Waldeck. In: Genealogy.eu by Miroslav Marek.
 Waldeck. In: An Online Gotha, by Paul Theroff.

1623 births
1668 deaths
John 02, Count of Waldeck-Landau
German military officers
Swedish Army major generals
17th-century German people
Military personnel from Hesse